Calvo Sotelo can refer to:

 José Calvo Sotelo, Spanish politician assassinated in 1936
 Leopoldo Calvo-Sotelo, Spanish prime minister from 1981 to 1982
 CF Calvo Sotelo, a Spanish association football team

Compound surnames